Godawari Vidhya Mandir is one of the oldest schools in Itahari, Nepal. Established in 1992 AD (2049 B.S.) the HSEB-affiliated school has an enrollment of over 1200 students.

About

The school also runs Sushma Godawari College, affiliated with Tribhuwan University, offering 3-year BBS in both English and Nepali, and 4-year BSC-CSIT degrees.
The school also established the CTEVT-recognized Sushma Koirala Memorial Engineering College (SKMEC) in 2057 B.S. (2000 AD), offering a 3-year Diploma in Civil and Computer Engineering. It also provides short-term training in plumbing, house wiring, along with electrical and electronics training.

Background
GVM is located at Itahari-7, Sunsari district. Since its beginning, GVM has received the best result performance in SLC.

Facilities
Audio-visual class, science and computer lab, library, school bus service, and canteen. A Montessori class for pre-primary level has been started since 2072 BS.

External links
 Official group in Facebook
 Website of Godawari Vidhya Mandir
 Website of Sushma Godawari College

References

Boarding schools in Nepal
Educational institutions established in 1992
Schools in Nepal
Schools in Itahari
1992 establishments in Nepal